Dominic Pezzola is an American member of the Proud Boys who is in jail, awaiting trial  on charges including seditious conspiracy for his participation in the January 6 United States Capitol attack. He is being held at the Correction Treatment 
Facility operated by the District of Columbia Department of Corrections.

Background
Pezzola is a resident of Rochester, New York. He graduated from The Aquinas Institute of Rochester in 1995. Classmates later described him as an "aloof, angry guy" who was a talented boxer and who frequently got into fights.

After graduation, Pezzola enlisted in the United States Marine Corps. He served from 1998 to 2005, and was promoted to corporal as an infantry assaultman.

At the time of his arrest, he owned a flooring company. In the years before his arrest, many Facebook friends reported that he was posting increasingly racist and extremist content, and many of them unfriended him.

Proud Boys membership
Pezzola was present at a pro-Trump rally in Washington, DC on December 12, 2020. That rally turned violent, and there was extensive street fighting in the aftermath. Four people were stabbed, two police officers were injured, and 23 people were arrested. His attorney later said that Pezzola had only been a member of the Proud Boys for a short time.

January 6 United States Capitol attack
According to federal prosecutors, Pezzola was among a group of about 100 Proud Boys who gathered near the Washington Monument at about 10:00 a.m. on January 6, 2021, under the operational command of Ethan Nordean. They 
had no intention of listening to Donald Trump's speech at The Ellipse. They were dressed incognito instead of in their customary black and yellow garb. Their plan was to "split up into groups, attempt to break into the Capitol building from as many different points as possible, and prevent the Joint Session of Congress from Certifying the Electoral College results."

Pezzola was among the very first who reached the entrances to the Capitol, and "ripped away" an officer’s riot shield, and "can be seen on video that has been widely distributed, using that riot shield to smash a window at the U.S. Capitol", according to prosecutors. An FBI witness said that Pezzola had "bragged about breaking the windows to the Capitol and entering the building" and that Pezzola had "said that anyone they got their hands on they would have killed," including Nancy Pelosi and Mike Pence.

Legal consequences
Pezzola was arrested nine days after the attack on the Capitol and his home was searched. Prosecutors said that they obtained a thumb drive that contained "instructions on how to make explosives and poison."

Pezzola's actions were discussed extensively at the Second impeachment of Donald Trump. Congressional delegate Stacey Plaskett said "Pezzola came to the Capitol on January 6 with deadly intentions," adding "He commandeered a Capitol Police shield, used it to smash a glass window, entered the Capitol, and paved the way for dozens of insurrectionists."

In late February, 2021, Pezzola's attorney said that he was considering a guilty plea, saying "Pezzola has indicated his desire to begin disposition negotiations and acceptance of responsibility for his actions." Pezzola did not plead guilty.

Also in late February, 2021, Assistant U.S. Attorney Erik Kenerson announced that charges of domestic terrorism would be added against Pezzola, describing it as a crime that "is calculated to influence or affect the conduct of government by intimidation or coercion, or to retaliate against government conduct," adding "At the entrance to the Capitol itself, Pezzola was not just on the front lines, but first to breach a window so successfully that he and other rioters could enter the Capitol through it".
 
In March of 2021, Pezzola's attorneys petitioned for him to be released on bail. A federal judge disagreed, issuing a detention order requiring Pezzola to be held in jail until his trial.

In June of 2022, charges of seditious conspiracy were added against Pezzola.   Prosecutors said the goal of the conspiracy was to "to oppose the lawful transfer of presidential power by force."
Pezzola was accused of "encouraging Proud Boys members to attend the January 6 protests, participating in meetings and encrypted conversations in Washington, D.C. to plan the attack, using communications equipment to coordinate the attack as it happened, directing, mobilizing, and leading the crowd onto Capitol grounds and inside the building, dismantling barricades, destroying property and assaulting police."

In October, 2022, Pezzola was among 33 jailed defendants accused of violence at the US Capitol who signed a petition asking to be transferred to the Guantanamo Bay detention camp in Cuba, claiming that the food and medical care was better there and that prisoners there had more religious freedom. 

On March 9, 2023, Politico reported that an email showed that an agent from the Justice Department had given an order to “destroy 338 items of evidence.”

References

People criminally charged for acts during the January 6 United States Capitol attack
American neo-fascists
Proud Boys
Alt-right
People from Rochester, New York
Political violence in the United States
Year of birth missing (living people)
Living people
Prisoners and detainees of the United States federal government